Navruz is celebrated widely in Uzbekistan. It is the day of the vernal equinox, and marks the beginning of spring in the Northern Hemisphere. It has been celebrated on the territory corresponding to modern-day Uzbekistan for at least two thousand years.  Nowruz widely celebrated on a vast territory of Central Asia and ritual practice acquired its special features. The festival was legitimized by prayers at mosques, and visits to the mazars of Muslim saints and to sacred streams. In the Emirate of Bukhara, a broad official celebration of Nowruz was started by Amir Muzaffar, who sought to strengthen the image of the Manghyt dynasty during the crisis of political legitimacy.

When Uzbekistan was part of the Soviet Union, celebrations of Navruz were generally unofficial, and at times even prohibited. Currently Navruz is an official public holiday in Uzbekistan and is always celebrated on March 21. Still, holiday celebrations are spread out over several days.

Navruz customs 

In preparation for the holiday, people tidy their homes and mahallas (neighborhoods), and buy new clothes. Before, during, and after Navruz, it is customary to prepare sumalak, the main ceremonial dish of the holiday. Sumalak is a sweet paste made entirely from germinated wheat and is cooked in a large kazan. To prepare sumalak friends, relatives, and neighbors – usually women – gather around the kazan, all taking a turn to stir the mixture. When ready, sumalak is distributed among neighbors, relatives, and friends. At Navruz, people also visit relatives and friends and give presents to children.

Navruz is often cited as the most popular holiday in Uzbekistan. On March 21, elaborate holiday concerts are organized across the country, notably in the capital city of Tashkent. Book fairs, concerts, games, and special televisision and radio programs last for the whole month of March. It has been noted that after Uzbekistan gained independence in 1991, government officials have promoted Navruz as a main national holiday and have tightly controlled the content and form of the festivities.

References

External links 
 Navruz in Uzbekistan

March observances
Uzbekistan
Nowruz
Public holidays in Uzbekistan
Society of Uzbekistan